Titanomis is a genus of moths containing a single species Titanomis sisyrota, also known as the frosted phoenix.  Taxonomists have difficulty placing this moth within an existing superfamily. The species is currently regarded as endemic to New Zealand. Only ten specimens have ever been found and none since 1959; it is classified as "Data Deficient" by the Department of Conservation.

Taxonomy and etymology 

Titanomis is considered an enigmatic unplaced genus and may require its own family. The genus and species were first described by Edward Meyrick in 1888 using a specimen collected by George Hudson.

The location of collection of that specimen was unclear as a result an error made by Meyrick. Hudson, in his 1928 book The Moths and Butterflies of New Zealand, discussed and illustrated this species. There he recorded the holotype being caught in 1882 in Nelson. However the label written by Meyrick stated that the holotype was collected by Hudson on 10 May 1885 in Wellington. John S. Dugdale, in his Annotated Catalogue of New Zealand Lepidoptera, accepted that the type locality of the species was Nelson. The error arose as Meyrick confused the details of the capture of the holotype with the details of its shipment to the United Kingdom.  The holotype specimen is held at the Natural History Museum, London.

The genus name is derived from Titan, meaning giant, and anomis, meaning anomalous. It refers to the size and unusual morphology of the group in which the species was originally placed. The epithet is derived from sisyrota, meaning wearing a shaggy garment, and refers to the hairs on the inner margin of the hindwings.

Description 
Meyrick described the species as follows:
The appearance of this moth may give clues as to its preferred habitat. It has been hypothesised that the whitish border of the wings assists the camouflage of the moth against mottled bark, indicating a possible preference for forest habitat.

Distribution 
    
The species is currently accepted as endemic to New Zealand.  However this is an extremely rare species with only 10 reliable records. Based on this irregular pattern of occurrences it has been hypothesised that the species may be a sporadic immigrant.

It has been found in the Waikato, Taupo, Wellington, Nelson, Marlborough, Westland and Southland areas. The earliest capture recorded was at Greymouth in December 1874, and other specimens were taken in Nelson at around the same time. Other than the type specimen mentioned above, specimens were also collected in Blenheim in 1883, in Otaki in 1886, again in Nelson in 1898, in Haldane in Southland in 1900, and in Rangataua in 1921. The last collection of this species took place at Waipapa Dam in 1959.

Biology and behaviour
Very little is known of the biology of this species. The adults are on the wing from December until March. They are attracted to light with at least two specimens collected in living rooms and another at the flood lights of Waipapa Dam. It has been hypothesised, based on the living room collections, that the adult moth may be more attracted to weaker or less ultraviolet light sources.

Host species and habitat 
The host niche is unknown however based on the morphology of the species it has been hypothesised that the host may be woody branches or stems of living plants, rotten wood, or even a bracket fungus, as females likely insert their eggs into the larval host. Beech forest habitat had been located near where many of the specimens have been taken. It has also been hypothesised that larvae of the moth may be associated with rotten podocarp wood as all the collection localities are close to valley floor kahikatea and matai forest. The 1959 collection of this species also occurred near a kanuka forest. It has been hypothesised that this species may be associated with wetland habit. The basis for this theory is that the females of this species come to light more frequently than the males and are therefore more likely to feed on scattered food sources. Species that have this attribute include those that prefer wetland habitat.

Conservation status 
This species has been classified as having the "Data Deficient" conservation status under the New Zealand Threat Classification System. Unfortunately there has been no record of capture of this species for over 50 years and as such the species is regarded by some as possibly extinct. However other experts regard extinction as not yet proven given the few New Zealand lepidopterists collecting specimens and searching for this species.

References

External links

Image of holotype specimen
 Titanomis sisyrota discussed on RNZ Critter of the Week, 9 August 2019 

Moths described in 1888
Monotypic moth genera
Moths of New Zealand
Endemic fauna of New Zealand
Taxa named by Edward Meyrick
Endemic moths of New Zealand